Suzuya may refer to one of two cruisers of the Imperial Japanese Navy, named for the Susuya River in Karafuto:

 , the former  captured by Japan during the Russo-Japanese War; scrapped in 1913

Japanese Navy ship names
Imperial Japanese Navy ship names